Leprodera is a genus of longhorn beetles of the subfamily Lamiinae, containing the following species:

 Leprodera elongata J. Thomson, 1857
 Leprodera verrucosa Pascoe, 1866

References

Lamiini